Sergio Ghisalberti (born 10 December 1979 in San Giovanni Bianco) is an Italian professional road bicycle racer.

Palmares 

 Vuelta a Burgos - Mountains Competition (2006)
 Giro di Lombardia - U23 version (2003)

External links 

1979 births
Living people
Italian male cyclists
Cyclists from the Province of Bergamo